Kellyville may refer to:

Australia
 Kellyville, New South Wales, suburb of Sydney
 Kellyville Ridge, New South Wales, suburb of Sydney
 North Kellyville, New South Wales, suburb of Sydney

United States
 Kellyville, Kentucky, United States
 Kellyville, Oklahoma, United States
 Kellyville, Pennsylvania (in Delaware County, Pennsylvania)
 Kellyville, Texas, United States

See also
 Kelleyville, village of Newport, New Hampshire
 Sondrestrom Upper Atmospheric Research Facility (colloq. Kellyville)